Verdict is a 2019 Philippine crime drama film directed by Raymund Ribay Gutierrez. It was selected as the Philippine entry for the Best International Feature Film at the 92nd Academy Awards, but it was not nominated.

Plot
A wife seeks justice after she and her daughter are victims of domestic abuse.

Cast
 Max Eigenmann as Joy Santos
 Kristoffer King as Dante Santos
 Jordhen Suan as Angel Santos
 Dolly de Leon as Elsa
 Rene Durian as Judge

Release
Verdict was screened from September 5 to 15, 2019 as part of the Toronto International Film Festival. The film was screened in select cinemas in the Philippines from September 13 to 19, 2019 as part of the Pista ng Pelikulang Pilipino film festival.

Reception
The film received the special jury prize (Horizons) at the 2019 Venice Film Festival and was the only Southeast Asian film to feature in the film festival. On Rotten Tomatoes, the film has an approval of 100% based on 10 reviews.

See also
 List of submissions to the 92nd Academy Awards for Best International Feature Film
 List of Philippine submissions for the Academy Award for Best International Feature Film

References

External links
 

2019 films
2019 crime drama films
Philippine crime drama films
Filipino-language films
2010s Tagalog-language films
Films about domestic violence